Dolmarz (also known as Dowlemarz and Dūlmarz) is a village in Gahrbaran-e Shomali Rural District, Gahrbaran District, Miandorud County, Mazandaran Province, Iran. At the 2006 census, its population was 803, in 176 families.

References 

Populated places in Miandorud County